Io amo Andrea (I Love Andrea) is a 2000 Italian romantic comedy film directed by Francesco Nuti.

Cast 
 Francesco Nuti as Dado 
 Francesca Neri as Andrea 
 Agathe de La Fontaine as Francesca 
 Marina Giulia Cavalli as Rossana
 Novello Novelli as the taxi driver

References

External links

2000 films
Italian romantic comedy films
Films directed by Francesco Nuti
2000 romantic comedy films
2000s Italian-language films
2000s Italian films